Andy Leek (born 1958) is a singer/songwriter, poet and musician, known for his work with Dexys Midnight Runners and Sir George Martin. He is an original member of Dexys Midnight Runners and played on the number one single "Geno". He has also written the single "Twist in the Dark" for Anni-Frid Lyngstad of ABBA. His solo single "Say Something" reached the number 1 position in Lebanon during the civil war.

Biography
Leek began his musical career while still at school in the progressive punk band The Wailing Cocks. The band released two singles on independent label Birds Nest, recorded two sessions for John Peel's Radio 1 show, Kid Jensen Live and Radio 2's in Concert Live. However, the band's career was cut short by the tragic death of their guitarist and Leek's best friend Alan Boyle.

At the age of 21, Leek joined Dexys Midnight Runners in late October 1979, playing on early recordings such as the hit single "Geno" and four other tracks on their debut album Searching for the Young Soul Rebels. Just before the band were at No. 1 in the charts with this track, Leek left to be a solo artist, saying that he "Really hating being famous all of a sudden ... Just because I've been on Top of the Pops doesn't mean I should get any more respect. I didn't want people asking for my autograph all of the time."

Two earlier songs Leek had recorded with the Wailing Cocks were then licensed to Beggars Banquet Records for release as a double-A-sided solo single: "Move On (In Your Maserati)" / "Ruben Decides". These were both played on Radio One and were single of the week in Sounds.

In early 1981, Leek teamed up with fellow ex-Dexys member Kevin "Al" Archer in his new band The Blue Ox Babes in which Leek played piano, harmonium, harmonica and sung backing vocals.

Some months later, on the strength of a demo tape of 16 new songs, Beggars Banquet paid for an album's worth of new material but this lay dormant until their belated release as Midnight Music on Leek's own Undiscovered Classics label in 2009. One song from these sessions, "Twist in the Dark", was recorded by Frida from ABBA for her 1984 solo album Shine, via a recommendation from Leek's friend Kirsty MacColl. Frida's version was also issued as a single around the world and she described this song as "her favourite song she had recorded outside of Abba".

For the rest of the 1980s, Leek pursued his own career as a musician, as well as writing a musical interpretation of a Dylan Thomas poem which was recorded and released by Tom Jones, and acting alongside Billie Whitelaw and David Van Day as an aspiring songwriter in the Tony Klinger-produced 1985 movie Promo-Man. A short-lived deal with indie label Fascination Records in 1984 led to two singles credited to Leek: "Soul Darling", with Specials producer Dave Jordan, and a version of ABBA's "Dancing Queen" produced by Tony Visconti .

In 1988, after signing a publishing and management contract with Hit n Run music, Atlantic Records in New York. Leek was honoured that, after hearing five of his tracks, George Martin had considered three of the five tracks as potential number 1's and he agreed to produce his 1988 album, Say Something. It was recorded in Martin's A.I.R. Studios with such musicians as Steve Howe of Yes, Clem Clempson, Luís Jardim on percussion, Alan Murphy of Level 42 on guitar, Peter-John Vettese (keyboards, from Jethro Tull), and veteran bassist Mo Fostera 36 piece orchestra on various tracks and the London Community Gospel Choir on the Golden Doors.

George Martin said that Andy "was one of the greatest artists he had ever produced". The first release from the album was Please Please.

In 2007 a Lebanese DJ/Producer, called aXess, contacted Leek to request to do a Salsa remix of the track. Say Something which had reached the number 1 position in Lebanon during the civil war.

Leek has since recorded three further albums, Eternity Beckons (including the single "All Around The World", which proved popular in Germany) the self-produced Sacrifice And Bliss (which yielded the single "Forgotten People") and Waking up the World (with the single of the same name) All of which are now being released on his own label. Eternity Beckons was also briefly available on a small Spanish label, Ouver Records. The song Forgotten people was also released on a compilation album which made it to number one in Spain.

After a period studying musical composition at Cardiff University, Leek formed his own "party band" Andy Leek & The Blue Angels, mostly at charity balls. Leek has also appeared on various TV shows: The James Whale Show, Never Mind The Buzzcocks, Later with Jools Holland and Children in Need three years running.

In 2010, Leek remixed the album Say Something now entitled Say Something Revisited released with the single "What's the Problem?".

22 years on in May 2013 Leek released a 16-track double concept album Waking up the World For this album each song has a sister song which reflects and explores the other side of its counterpart. This results in seven themes which tell a story of youth, experience, realisation and return.

In 2013 Leek started releasing his past music on YouTube with many lyric videos created.

Discography

Singles
"Move On (In Your Maserati)" (Beggars Banquet, 1980)
"Soul Darling" (Fascination, 1984)
"Dancing Queen" (Fascination, 1984)
"Say Something" (Atlantic, 1988)
"Please Please" (Atlantic, 1988)
"Holdin' Onto You" (Atlantic, 1988)
"All Around the World" (Polydor, 1996)
"Forgotten People" (Gotham, 1999)
"What's the Problem?" (Undiscovered Classics 2010)
"Homeground" (Undiscovered Classics 2010)
"Waking Up The World" (Undiscovered Classics 2013)
"Here in our Youth" (Undiscovered Classics 2013)

Albums
Say Something (Atlantic, 1988)
Eternity Beckons (Spanish-only release, Ouver, circa 1997)
Sacrifice and Bliss (unissued, 2000)
Midnight Music (Undiscovered Classics, 2009; recorded 1979–1982)
Say Something Revisited (Undiscovered Classics 2010)
Waking Up The World (Undiscovered Classics 2013)

References

External links
Official website
Andy Leek & The Blue Angels website
Waking Up The World album website

1958 births
English keyboardists
English male singers
Dexys Midnight Runners members
Living people